Maksym Stoyan (born 19 August 1980) is a professional Ukrainian footballer defender playing in the professional Ukrainian First League club Desna Chernihiv. He moved from the Ukrainian Second League club Dnipro Cherkasy on 29 August 2008.

References

1980 births
Living people
Ukrainian footballers
FC Desna Chernihiv players
FC Dnipro Cherkasy players
FC Metalurh Donetsk players
Association football defenders